The "Swiss Psalm" (  / "Trittst im Morgenrot daher..."; , ; , ;) is the national anthem of Switzerland.

It was composed in 1841, by Alberich Zwyssig (1808–1854). Since then, it has been frequently sung at patriotic events. The Federal Council declined, however, on numerous occasions to accept the psalm as the official anthem. This was because the council wanted the people to express their say on what they wanted as a national anthem. From 1961 to 1981, it provisionally replaced "" ("When You Call, My Country"; French ""; Italian "", Romansh ""), the anthem by Johann Rudolf Wyss (1743–1818) that was set to the melody of "God Save the King". On 1 April 1981, the Swiss Psalm was declared the official Swiss national anthem.

In 2014, the  organized a public competition and unofficial vote to change the lyrics of the national anthem.

History 
The German-language patriotic song "" (French "", Italian "", Romansh ""), composed in 1811 by Johann Rudolf Wyss (1743–1818), was used as the de facto national anthem from about 1850. The setting of the hymn to the British tune of "God Save the King" led to confusing situations when both countries' anthems were played. Therefore, it was replaced with another tune in 1961.

The Swiss Psalm was composed in 1841 by Alberich Zwyssig (1808–1854).

In the second half of the 19th century, the song became popular and was frequently sung at patriotic celebrations. Between 1894 and 1953, there were repeated suggestions for it to be adopted as official national anthem. In this, it was in competition with "Rufst du, mein Vaterland", a patriotic song that was widely seen as the de facto national anthem but was never given official status.

The Swiss Psalm temporarily became the national anthem in 1961. After a trial period of three years, the Swiss tune was adopted indefinitely in 1965. The statute could not be challenged until ten years later but did not totally exclude the possibility of an ultimate change. A competition was set up in 1979 to search for a successor to the anthem. Despite many submissions, none of the others seemed to express the Swiss sentiment. The Swiss anthem finally got its definitive statutory status in April 1981, the Federal Council maintaining that it was purely a Swiss song suitably dignified and solemn. The popularity of the song has not been established. At least, it has been shown with several vox pops taken that many people do not know it at all, and only a small percentage can recite it all.

Lyrics
Because Switzerland has four national languages, the lyrics of the original German song were adapted into the other three national languages: French, Italian and Romansh. The national anthem has also been translated into English, but the translation is believed to be still copyrighted.

IPA transcriptions

Proposals for a new anthem or new lyrics

1986: "" ("Roll the drums!") by Henri-Frédéric Amiel was proposed by the Swiss National Alliance.
Late 1990s: the Fondation Pro CH 98 tried to promote a new anthem composed by the Argovian Christian Daniel Jakob.
2014: the  started a public competition to find new lyrics for the national anthem. The instruction was to take inspiration from the preamble of the Federal Constitution of Switzerland. The jury received 208 proposals; it selected six of them and translated them in the four national languages of Switzerland. In March 2015, the six selected proposals were released on-line (with videos in four languages) and opened to public vote (until May 2015). The top three vote-getters were selected for a second on-line ballot between June and August. In September 2015, a televised final selected one set of lyrics. Finally, the Société suisse d'utilité publique will propose the winning lyrics to the federal authorities. As soon as the new hymn text is known enough, the Swiss Parliament and the electorate will be asked to determine it. As of 2017, the new lyrics have not been officially adopted. A version of the winning lyrics was also made by combining the four national languages of Switzerland. As 500,000 Swiss abroad and residents in Switzerland are native English speakers, the new hymn text has been translated not only into the four official Swiss languages but also into English. More information and the scores of the hymn can be found at: .

Notes

References

External links 

 

National anthems
Swiss music
National symbols of Switzerland
Swiss patriotic songs
European anthems
1841 songs
National anthem compositions in B-flat major